James Walter Grimes, known as Jim Grimes, is an American botanist.

Career

Grimes can be attributed to over 240 taxa names, either as sole author or co-author.
Grimes worked at the New York Botanical Garden studying Fabaceae. In 1996 Grimes moved to Australia, taking up a position in the National Herbarium of Victoria, Royal Botanic Gardens Victoria as Mueller Fellow July–October 1996, where he worked on developmental morphology of inflorescences in Acacia. From July 1997 to his resignation in February 2002, Grimes was in the position of Systematic Botanist. His research interests included the systematics of Fabaceae, subfamily Mimosoideae, and the historic collections held in the Herbarium.
Grimes was co-organiser of the 2001 Legumes Down Under conference. He served as Taxonomic Co-ordinator for legume tribes Ingeae and Psoraleeae for the International Legume Database and Information Service (ILDIS) 2000–2, and as Councillor of the Society of Australian Systematic Biologists 2001–2.
Grimes was Editor of Muelleria from 1997 to 2001

A significant number, over 1000 collections, are held at NY.
MEL holds over 300 specimens collected by Grimes. Other herbaria in Australia holding his collections include MELU, CANB, NSW, HO, ATH, AD, and BRI.

Standard author abbreviation

Selected published names
Abarema abbottii (Rose & Leonard) Barneby & J.W.Grimes
Zygia turneri (McVaugh) Barneby & J.W.Grimes

 See also :Category:Taxa named by James Walter Grimes

and

International Plant Name Index

Selected publications

Journal articles
 Barneby, R.C. & Grimes, J.W. (1996). Silk tree, guanacaste, monkey's earring: a generic system for the synandrous Mimosaceae of the Americas. Part I. Abarema, Albizia, and allies. Mem. New York Bot. Gard. 74: 1–292.
 Grimes, J.W. (1996). Nomenclatural changes in Cullen (Fabaceae: Psoraleeae). Muelleria 9: 195–196.

References 

1953 births
Botanists active in Australia
20th-century American botanists
21st-century American botanists
Living people
University of Texas at Austin alumni
Muelleria (journal) editors